In enzymology, 4-aminobutyrate transaminase, also called GABA transaminase or 4-aminobutyrate aminotransferase, or GABA-T, is an enzyme that catalyzes the chemical reaction:

4-aminobutanoate + 2-oxoglutarate  succinate semialdehyde + L-glutamate

Thus, the two substrates of this enzyme are 4-aminobutanoate (GABA) and 2-oxoglutarate. The two products are succinate semialdehyde and L-glutamate.

This enzyme belongs to the family of transferases, specifically the transaminases, which transfer nitrogenous groups. The systematic name of this enzyme class is 4-aminobutanoate:2-oxoglutarate aminotransferase. This enzyme participates in 5 metabolic pathways: alanine and aspartate metabolism, glutamate metabolism, beta-alanine metabolism, propanoate metabolism, and butanoate metabolism. It employs one cofactor, pyridoxal phosphate.

This enzyme is found in prokaryotes, plants, fungi, and animals (including humans). Pigs have often been used when studying how this protein may work in humans.

Enzyme Commission number 
GABA-T is Enzyme Commission number 2.6.1.19. This means that it is in the transferase class of enzymes, the nitrogenous transferase sub-class and the transaminase sub-subclass. As a nitrogenous transferase, its role is to transfer nitrogenous groups from one molecule to another. As a transaminase, GABA-T's role is to move functional groups from an amino acid and a α-keto acid, and vice versa. In the case of GABA-T, it takes a nitrogen group from GABA and uses it to create L-glutamate.

Reaction pathway 
In animals, fungi, and bacteria, GABA-T helps facilitate a reaction that moves an amine group from GABA to 2-oxoglutarate, and a ketone group from 2-oxoglutarate to GABA. This produces succinate semialdehyde and L-glutamate. In plants, pyruvate and glyoxylate can be used in the place of 2-oxoglutarate. catalyzed by the enzyme 4-aminobutyrate—pyruvate transaminase:

(1) 4-aminobutanoate (GABA) + pyruvate   succinate semialdehyde + L-alanine
 (2) 4-aminobutanoate (GABA) + glyoxylate   succinate semialdehyde + glycine

Cellular and metabolic role 
The primary role of GABA-T is to break down GABA as part of the GABA-Shunt. In the next step of the shunt, the semialdehyde produced by GABA-T will be oxidized to succinic acid by succinate-semialdehyde dehydrogenase, resulting in succinate. This succinate will then enter mitochondrion and become part of the citric acid cycle. The critic acid cycle can then produce 2-oxoglutarate, which can be used to make glutamate, which can in turn be made into GABA, continuing the cycle.

GABA is a very important neurotransmitter in animal brains, and a low concentration of GABA in mammalian brains has been linked to several neurological disorders, including Alzheimer's disease and Parkinson's disease. Because GABA-T degrades GABA, the inhibition of this enzyme has been the target of many medical studies. The goal of these studies is to find a way to inhibit GABA-T activity, which would reduce the rate that GABA and 2-oxoglutarate are converted to semialdehyde and L-glutamate, thus raising GABA concentration in the brain. There is also a genetic disorder in humans which can lead to a deficiency in GABA-T. This can lead to developmental impairment or mortality in extreme cases.

In plants, GABA can be produced as a stress response. Plants also use GABA to for internal signaling and for interactions with other organisms near the plant. In all of these intra-plant pathways, GABA-T will take on the role of degrading GABA. It has also been demonstrated that the succinate produced in the GABA shunt makes up a significant proportion of the succinate needed by the mitochondrion.

In fungi, the breakdown of GABA in the GABA shunt is key in ensuring maintaining a high level of activity in the critic acid cycle. There is also experimental evidence that the breakdown of GABA by GABA-T plays a role in managing oxidative stress in fungi.

Structural Studies 
There have been several structures solved for this class of enzymes, given PDB accession codes, and published in peer reviewed journals. There are actually some differences between the enzyme structure for these organisms. E. coli enzymes of GABA-T lack an iron-sulfur cluster that is found in the pig model.

Active sites 
Amino acid residues found in the active site of 4-aminobutyrate transaminase include Lys-329, which are found on each of the two subunits of the enzyme. This site will also bind with a pyridoxal 5'􏰌- phosphate co-enzyme.

Inhibitors 

 Aminooxyacetic acid
 Gabaculine
 Phenelzine
 Phenylethylidenehydrazine (PEH)
 Rosmarinic acid
 Valproic acid
 Vigabatrin

References

Further reading

External links 

 

EC 2.6.1
Pyridoxal phosphate enzymes
Enzymes of known structure
GABA
Glutamate (neurotransmitter)